Tiv is a Tivoid language spoken in some states in North Central Nigeria, with some speakers in Cameroon. It had over 5 million speakers in 2020. The largest population of  Tiv speakers are found in Benue state in Nigeria. The language is also widely spoken in the Nigerian states of Plateau, Taraba, Nasarawa, Cross River, Adamawa, Kaduna, and Abuja. It is by far the largest of the Tivoid languages, a group of languages belonging to the Southern Bantoid languages

Geographic distribution
Tiv is widely spoken in the States of Benue, Nasarawa, Plateau, Taraba, Cross Rivers, Adamawa, Kaduna, and Abuja. Other parts of Nigeria also speak Tiv.

Benue state 
Tarkaa, Makurdi, Gwer East, Gwer west, Ukum, Logo, Konshisha, Gboko, Kwande, Vandeikya, Katsina Ala, Guma, Buruku, and Ushongo Local Government Areas.

Nassarawa state
Doma, Nasarawa, Lafia, Obi, Keana, and Awe Local Government Areas

Plateau state
Qua’an Pan and Shendam Local Government Areas

Taraba state
Bali, Donga, Ibi, Gassol, Takum, Gashaka, Kurmi and Wukari Local Government Areas

Cross River state
Yala, Bekwara, Obudu, and Obanliku Local Government Areas.

Cameroon
There are 1700 Tiv households with approximately 11,000 people at the south-western border of Cameroon, Manyu division, north east of Akwaya on the Nigerian border, and bordering the Iyom tribes of Cameroon. Their paramount ruler is Zaki Abaajul, who has the Tiv and Ulitsi as his subjects. The Cameronian Tiv are well educated and live in anglophone Cameroon as their ancestral land, while a few others live in the francophone region. They are mostly farmers but others work in the government.

Dialects 
Tiv has no dialects. Tiv speakers can understand each other across their territory. However, accents (ham) exist.

Phonology

Vowels 

 Vowel sounds are phonetically nasalized before nasal consonants.

Consonants 

  is heard in free variation in word-final positions.
  occurs in other dialects.

Tone 
Tiv has three main tones (five if rising and falling are counted as separate tones instead of composites of existing tones). They are most importantly used in inflection.

Accents 
The accents of Tiv are as follows:
 Ityoisha, spoken in the southeast, noted for its exaggerated palatalisation of vowels;
 Shitile, spoken by most Tiv east of the Katsina Ala River, apparently slower sounding than the other Tiv accents and slurs vowels into their neighbouring consonant;
 Iharev, which gives an exaggerated roll to the phoneme ~
 Kparev, spoken in the centre and south-centre;
 Kunav, a sub-accent of Kparev, noted for its preference for  sounds where other Kparev use .
Vocabulary, particularly plant and tool names, changes from one part of Tiv territory to the other.

History and classification 
The first reference to the Tiv language (dzwa Tiv) was made by Koelle (1854) from liberated slaves from Sierra Leone. Johnston (1919) classified it as a peculiar language among the Semi-Bantu languages, and Talbot (1926) concurred. Abraham (1933), who has made the most complete linguistic study of Tiv, classifies it as Bantu, stating that its vocabulary is more similar to the East African Nyanza group of Bantu languages than to Ekoi or other neighbouring languages. Malherbe (1933) agrees with Abraham that Tiv is essentially Bantu.

All material on Tiv seems to point to a recent expansion, perhaps in the early 15th century.

Morphology 
Tiv has nine noun classes.

See also
Tiv people
Ate-u-tiv, a traditional Tiv hut used for reception and gathering

References

R.C.Abraham, A Dictionary of the Tiv Language, Government of Nigeria 1940, republished by Gregg Press Ltd., Farnborough, Hants., England 1968.

External links
Tiv-English Dictionary
PanAfrican L10n page on Tiv

Religious materials 

 Video and audio files, New World Translation of the Christian Greek Scriptures Released and other bible study material in Tiv Language by Jehovah's Witnesses
 The bible in the tiv language
 Gospel
 Jesus film in tiv

Languages of Nigeria
Tivoid languages
Tiv people